Warm Hand is the debut solo album by New Zealand songwriter Don McGlashan. Released in May 2006, it was a finalist for the 2006 New Zealand Music Awards' Album of the Year, while McGlashan was a finalist for Best Male Solo Artist for his work on the album. The live band that toured in support of the album, Don McGlashan and the Seven Sisters, comprised Sean James Donnelly (SJD), John Segovia, and Chris O'Connor.

The song "Toy Factory Fire" refers to the Kader Toy Factory Fire and "Miracle Sun" is about Opo the dolphin at Hokianga in 1955-6.

Track listing

Personnel
Don McGlashan – voice, guitars, ukulele, percussion
Ross Burge — drums
John Segovia — pedal steel, slide guitar
Sean Donnelly — bass, backing vocals
Tatiana Lanchtchikova — accordion
Alan Norman — accordion
 Chris O'Connor: drums, piano ("This is London"), drums ("I Will Not Let You Down")
Will Scott — drums ("Harbour Bridge")
 Miranda Adams — violin ("Miracle Sun")
 Mark Bell — guitar ("Harbour Bridge", "Courier")
Graeme Humphreys — piano ("Harbour Bridge")
Jason Smith — harmonium ("I Will Not Let You Down")
Alan Pitts — saw ("Interlude")

Compilation albums

 "Harbour Bridge"
 Kiwi Hit Disc 92, NZ On Air, April 2007.
 Now Hear This, The Word, No 49, March 2007 (UK).
 "I Will Not Let You Down"
 Kiwi Hit Disc 87, NZ On Air, October 2006.
 New Zealand New Music, IV, 2006 New Zealand Trade and Enterprise, 2006.
 "Miracle Sun"
 Kiwi Hit Disc 81, NZ On Air, April 2006.
 Music 4 Maui's - Songs To Save A Species, Various Artists, Music 4 Mauis, 15 June 2008.
 The album was released to promote the plight of the endangered Maui dolphin. The tracks were donated free of charge.
 "This Is London"
 Sounds of the Planet: Womad 2007, Filter Music, FM020, 2007.
 "Toy Factory Fire"
 Nuclear Free Nation, Various Artists, Integrity Promotions New Zealand, 12 June 2007.

Soundtracks

 "I Will Not Let You Down"
 Out of the Blue, 2006.
 The Tattooist, 2007.

Award Nominations

 The first single, "Miracle Sun", was a nominee for the 2006 APRA Silver Scroll award, a songwriting award.

Notes

2006 debut albums
Don McGlashan albums